Ulów may refer to the following places:
Ulów, Lublin Voivodeship (east Poland)
Ulów, Masovian Voivodeship (east-central Poland)
Ulów, Świętokrzyskie Voivodeship (south-central Poland)